A Belgian passport is a travel document issued by Belgium to Belgian citizens to facilitate international travel. It grants the bearer international passage in accordance with visa requirements and serves as proof of citizenship.

Types of passports

Standard passports 
Standard passports are issued for ordinary travel, such as vacations and business trips. They are burgundy, available in 35 and 60-page formats, and are valid for 7 years.

Special passports 
Diplomatic passports are issued to members of the Belgian Royal Family, members of the government, ministers of State and representatives of Belgium or of the Communities or Regions (diplomats, economic or trade attaches, the main representative of each Community or Region).

Service passports are issued to civil servants within the federal public services, ministries, parliaments and judicial services sent on an official mission abroad by the Belgian authorities.

Temporary passports are issued in Emergency Conditions, if there is a justifiable urgent matter requiring immediate travel. They are dark green and valid for only 6 months.

Emergency Travel Documents are issued by Belgian diplomatic representatives abroad when a previously issued passport has been lost. They have only 6 pages.

Physical appearance
Belgian passports use the standard EU design and are usually burgundy.

Text on the front cover is printed in three languages: Dutch, French and German. The sequence of the languages varies according to the lingual community of the bearer (either Dutch-French-German, French-Dutch-German or German-French-Dutch).

The front cover is emblazoned with the Belgian smaller Coat of arms.

The following words are inscribed above the coat of arms:"EUROPESE UNIE" (Dutch), "UNION EUROPÉENNE" (French), "EUROPÄISCHE UNION" (German)

"KONINKRIJK BELGIË" (Dutch), "ROYAUME DE BELGIQUE" (French), "KÖNIGREICH BELGIEN" (German)The following is inscribed below the coat of arms:"PASPOORT – PASSEPORT – REISEPASS"Biometric passports have been issued since 2015 and these bear the standard biometric symbol at the bottom of the front cover.

Administration

Passport issuance 
Belgian passports are issued by FPS Foreign Affairs, the country's ministry of foreign affairs. Belgian citizens may apply for a passport at the municipality or embassy where they are legally registered, which in turn procures the passport from the ministry.

Passports cost approximately €93.50 depending on the location of issuance. It is possible to make an urgent application at a higher cost.

The passport identifier is an 8-character alphanumeric with the structure AB123456; 2 alphas followed by 6 digits.

Lost and stolen passports 
According to the Belgian police, 19,050 blank Belgian passports had been stolen between 1990 and 2002 and had been used to create forged travel documents.

Due to concerns about forgery, the Belgian authorities charge increasingly higher fees for the replacement of lost or stolen passports after the 2nd and 3rd loss.

Citizenship of the European Union 
Belgian citizens are also citizens of the European Union and thus enjoy the rights of free movement and residence in any other country also in the European Union, as well as other European Economic Area states and Switzerland. The right to free movement is provided for in Article 21 of the EU Treaty.

Travel freedom of Belgian citizens

Belgian citizens are able to use their identity card to travel within the European Union and to other countries in the periphery of Europe.

As of 13 April 2021, Belgian citizens had visa-free or visa-on-arrival access to 187 countries and territories, ranking the Belgian passport 7th in the world according to the Henley Passport Index.

Gallery of historic images

See also
 Belgian nationality law
Belgian identity card
Visa requirements for Belgian citizens
 Passports of the European Union

References

External links

Belgium
Government of Belgium
European Union passports